Association for Informal Logic and Critical Thinking (AILACT) is a scholarly organization founded in 1983, whose purpose is to promote the study of informal logic and critical thinking. The organization sponsors programs in conjunction with the American Philosophical Association and the Canadian Philosophical Association.

External links  
AILACT website

Logic organizations
Critical thinking
Organizations established in 1983